Chhattisgarh Air link was a private non-scheduled airline based in Chhattisgarh, India. It was a subsidiary of Chhattisgarh Aviation Academy. It flew non-scheduled and scheduled flights operated on a charter and individual ticket basis. The airline started operations in December 2012. As of April 2019, the airline's website is defunct.

Destinations
The airline flew to the following destinations-

Raipur – Swami Vivekananda Airport (Base)
Jamshedpur – Sonari Airport
Bhubaneshwar – Biju Patnaik International Airport
Rourkela –  Rourkela Airport
Jharsuguda – Jharsuguda Airport
Bilaspur – Bilaspur Airport
Raigarh – Raigarh Airport
Jagdalpur – Jagdalpur Airport

Fleet
Chhattishgarh Airlink's fleet consists of:

References

Defunct airlines of India
Airlines established in 2012
Indian companies established in 2012
Companies based in Chhattisgarh
2012 establishments in Chhattisgarh